Charles Lea may refer to:
Charles Léa (born 1951), Cameroonian footballer
Charlie Lea (1956–2011), French-born baseballer player
Charles James Lea (1820s–1884), English interior artist
Henry Charles Lea (1825–1909), American historian

See also 
Charles Lee (disambiguation), several people